Portamento is the second studio album by American indie pop band The Drums. The album was released in the United Kingdom on September 2, 2011 through Moshi Moshi and Island Records and was preceded by the release of lead single "Money" on August 19.

Reception

Portamento received mixed reviews. Review aggregator Metacritic assigned an average critic score of 64 out of 100 based on 22 reviews. Helen Clarke of musicOMH gave the album four out of five stars, saying, "With their second album The Drums are more absorbing than ever, and have created a record that will last far longer than their first." Mike Williams of NME wrote, "With a little more self-censorship and less browbeating we'd be looking at one of the albums of the year," awarding the record 7/10.

Singles
"Money" is the lead single taken from Portamento. The single was released as a digital download in the United Kingdom on September 4, 2011. "How It Ended" was the second single released in the UK on 3 October 2011. "Days" was the third single from the album released in the UK on February 27, 2012.

Track listing

Personnel
 Jonathan Pierce – Vocals, Drums
 Jacob Graham – Synthesizer
 Connor Hanwick – Guitar
 Lee Hanwick - Saxophone on What You Were

Charts

Release history

References

2011 albums
The Drums albums
Island Records albums